Saunders's tern (Sternula saundersi), sometimes known as the black-shafted tern, is a species of bird in the family Laridae.
It is sparsely resident along the shores of the north-western Indian Ocean (namely southern Somalia, Arabian peninsula, Socotra, Pakistan, Andaman and Nicobar Islands and northern Sri Lanka).

It is a close relative of the little tern, least tern, yellow-billed tern, and Peruvian tern. In non-breeding plumages, the Saunder's tern and the little tern may be almost indistinguishable. The two have been considered by some to be conspecific.

Description 
Saunders's tern shares many of the features of its close relative, the little tern, including a white body, a black-tipped yellow bill, and a black cap with a white forehead patch. In its breeding plumage, it distinguishes itself with a straight-bordered forehead patch, possessing more black outer primaries, and duskier colored legs and feet in comparison to the bright yellow legs of the little tern. In non-breeding plumage, the two are very similar.

Saunders's tern is 20–28 cm (8-11 in) long, weighs 40-45 grams, and possesses a wingspan of 50-55 cm(20-21 in). It has an average wing length of 16.6 cm(6.5 in), an average bill length of 2.8 cm(1.1 in), and a tail fork depth of about 2.8 cm(1.1 in) on average.

Taxonomy 
Saunders's tern was first described in 1877 by British botanist and ornithologist Allan Octavian Hume during his stay in British India as part of the Imperial Civil Service. It was originally given the name black-shafted ternlet (Sterna saundersi) by Hume, which was later changed to its present common name.

It is considered by some to be a subspecies of Sternula albifrons, potentially of a larger species group, or otherwise conspecific.

Behavior

Feeding 
The majority of the Saunders's tern's diet consists of various marine animals, including small fish, crustaceans, and mollusks. It will also eat several varieties of insects. An individual will hover above the water for a sizable amount of time, before making a plunge dive to catch fish.

References

Saunders's tern
Birds of Western Asia
Birds of Pakistan
Birds of Sri Lanka
Saunders's tern
Taxonomy articles created by Polbot